Erik Ernst is a prominent computer scientist and an Associate Professor at the University of Aarhus in Denmark. In 2010, he won the Dahl-Nygaard Prize.

External links

References

Computer scientists
Living people
Dahl–Nygaard Prize
Academic staff of Aarhus University
Year of birth missing (living people)